New Orleans University was a historically black college that operated between 1869 and 1935 in New Orleans, Louisiana, United States. It was founded by Freedmen's Aid Society and the Methodist Episcopal Church. It merged with Straight College in 1935 to form Dillard University.

History
New Orleans University was founded in 1869 by the Freedmen's Aid Society with funds from the Methodist Episcopal Church. It was located above Canal Street (present-day Lower Garden District), at Camp and Race streets in New Orleans. In the year 1869, sixteen schools for African Americans were active in the New Orleans area. It later moved to 5318 St. Charles Avenue, near what is presently Jefferson Avenue.

New Orleans University was considered an auxiliary school to the Gilbert Academy, a prestigious college-preparatory school for African-American students in New Orleans. The two schools formed an administrative merger in 1919, with the two institutions remaining in their respective locations. When New Orleans University and Straight College combined to form Dillard University at a new campus in Gentilly in 1935, Gilbert Academy moved into the buildings vacated by New Orleans University.

Notable alumni 

 John Louis Wilson Jr. (1898–1989), American architect

References

External links

 

Educational institutions established in 1869
Universities and colleges in New Orleans
Historically black universities and colleges in the United States
Defunct private universities and colleges in Louisiana
Educational institutions disestablished in 1935
Dillard University
1869 establishments in Louisiana
1935 disestablishments in Louisiana